La Hacquinière is one of the two RER B stations of Bures-sur-Yvette, near Paris, in France. It is also the name of a district of this town.

Réseau Express Régional stations
Railway stations in Essonne
Railway stations in France opened in 1957